For other people named John Platt, see John Platt.

John Milton Platt (April 18, 1840 – September 27, 1919) was a physician and political figure in Ontario, Canada. He represented Prince Edward in the House of Commons of Canada from 1882 to 1891 as a Liberal member.

He was born in Athol Township, Upper Canada, the son of Dyer Platt and Myria Morgan. Platt was educated at the Fort Edward Institute in New York state and at Victoria University in Cobourg. In 1872, Platt married Amelia Branscombe. He also served as a public school inspector and as surgeon for the militia. Platt was editor and publisher for the Picton New Nation. His election in 1888 was overturned after an appeal but he won the by-election that followed. He was defeated by Archibald Campbell Miller when he ran for reelection in 1891. Platt later served as warden for Kingston Penitentiary from 1899 to 1913. He died in Picton at the age of 79.

References 

1840 births
1919 deaths
Members of the House of Commons of Canada from Ontario
Liberal Party of Canada MPs
Physicians from Ontario